Dendryphantes acutus is a jumping spider species in the genus Dendryphantes that lives in Lesotho. It was first identified in 2014.

References

Spiders described in 2014
Spiders of Africa
Fauna of Lesotho
Salticidae
Taxa named by Wanda Wesołowska